John Baird, D.D. (died 1804), was an Irish divine.

Baird came to Dublin from the Isle of Man, and was ordained minister of the presbyterian congregation of Capel Street 11 January 1767. Here he ministered for ten years, not very happily, and in 1777 he was compelled to resign. Shortly after doing so he brought out the first and only volume of a projected series on the Old Testament; a work of some learning, originally delivered as lectures at Capel Street, and dedicated (12 November 1777) to James Trail, bishop of Down. Baird soon afterwards conformed, and on 7 Sep 1782 was appointed by the crown to the rectory of Cloghran, near Dublin, where he died unmarried early in 1804. He published 'Dissertations, Chronological, Historical, and Critical, of all the Books of the Old Testament; through which are interspersed Reflections, Theological and Moral,' &c., Dublin, 1778, vol. i. (extending to Exod. xx.)

References

18th-century births
Year of birth missing
1804 deaths
19th-century Irish clergy
18th-century Irish clergy
Manx Protestants
Irish Presbyterian ministers